A slap bracelet (or snap bracelet) was a bracelet invented by Wisconsin teacher Stuart Anders in 1983, sold originally under the brand name of "Slap Wrap". Consisting of layered, flexible stainless steel bistable spring bands sealed within a fabric, silicone, or plastic cover, it can snap around a wrist when slapped on it with some force. It can have many different colours and/or designs.

History

It was a popular fad among children, pre-teens, and teenagers in the early 1990s. It was available in a wide variety of patterns and colors. The bracelet was banned in several schools following reports of injuries from worn out or modified versions.

In 2018, different slap bracelets were recalled: "The slap bracelet’s metal wristband can pierce the protective fabric around it and expose sharp edges, posing a laceration hazard to young children."

References

External links
 Whatever Happened To Slap Bracelets? The Dark History Of A Banned, Dirty, and High-Tech Accessory
 What is a Slap Bracelet?

Bracelets
1990s fads and trends
1990s fashion
Products introduced in 1990